The Go Masters (Japanese: 未完の対局, Mikan no taikyoku) is a 1982 Japanese-Chinese co-production film directed by Junya Sato and Jishun Duan (段吉順). It won the Grand Prix des Amériques, the main prize at the Montreal World Film Festival.

References

External links
 
 

1982 films
Films directed by Junya Satō
Films set in the Taishō period
1980s Japanese films